Rajasthan Ratna (Jewel of Rajasthan or Gem of Rajasthan) is the highest civilian award of Rajasthan. Any person without distinction of race, occupation, position, or sex is eligible for the award.

Awardees are given one hundred thousand rupees, a shawl, and a citation by the state governor, chief minister, and minister of art and
culture. The award mirrors the Bharat Ratna which is conferred by the Government of India.

2012
First time following Rajasthanis were conferred award:-
Allah Jilai Bai, singer
Kanhaiyalal Sethia, poet
Komal Kothari, author
Lakshmi Kumari Chundawat, author
Vijaydan Detha, author
Jagjit Singh, singer
Vishwa Mohan Bhatt, musician

Except for Chundawat, Detha and Bhatt, the award was conferred posthumously.

2013
D. R. Mehta (social service)
Jasdev Singh (commentary)
Ram Narayan (sarangi player)
Nagendra Singh (law)
Kailash Sankhala (environment protection)
Hasrat Jaipuri (Urdu Hindi poet)
Gavri Devi (Maand singer)

References

State awards and decorations of India
People from Rajasthan